Aidchild, a not-for-profit organization incorporated in both Uganda and the United States, was established in 2000 as a hospice center for orphans living with AIDS who did not have the care of extended family members.  In 2002, it became the first pediatric facility in Uganda to provide free anti-retroviral drugs to children. Today,  more than 3,000 children have received care and treatment through Aidchild's inpatient and outpatient services, including a laboratory, two clinics, homes and academies in Masaka and Mpigi, Uganda.

Aidchild is supported by a mix of government and private donors and income-generating activities.

History
Aidchild was founded by Nathaniel Dunigan.
Dunigan first visited Uganda when he was Deputy Director of the Office of the Governor in Tucson, Arizona. A one-month assignment as a volunteer HIV-prevention educator had taken him to Africa where he met many children who were suffering and dying.  On his return to the US, he resolved to make a difference, and completed a feasibility study for his Aidchild concept. At the age of 26, he resigned from his job, sold his car and belongings, and moved to Uganda. He had an initial budget of just $3,500.  Two years later, Aidchild was chosen by the Ugandan and American governments as a model of pediatric HIV/AIDS care for the entire continent of Africa.   A second center was created just after that, as was a treatment laboratory that has served the needs of more than 3,000 children and adults living with AIDS.

Social entrepreneurship
Aidchild operates the Equation Gallery, an art gallery and café on the Equator line in Uganda; Ten Tables, a restaurant and screening room in Masaka, and Aidchild's Terrace Club, a rooftop barbecue venue and boutique hostel.  International travel guides have called the businesses the very best in the whole of Eastern and Central Africa.  Clients include international celebrities, Ambassadors, and UN personnel.  Lonely Planet calls Aidchild's Equation Café “first class,” and Oscar winner Emma Thompson says it is “possibly the best shop on the planet”.  The Eye magazine named Aidchild’s restaurant the best in the nation in 2008.

The organization earns 70% of its own budget from these businesses, and is 100% administratively self-sustained thanks to a Ugandan management team.

Nathaniel Dunigan
Dr. Nathaniel Dunigan was raised on the Navajo reservation in the southwestern United States.

Work in the United States
Dunigan has testified before the United States Congress in Washington, DC as an expert witness in the identification of best practices of care for orphans living with AIDS, and other vulnerable children in Africa.  In 2004, Dunigan was nominated for the World of Children Award. He is the author of "We Are Not Mahogany: Three stories about the male African life."

After living in rural Uganda for nine years, Dunigan completed a master's degree in education at the Harvard Graduate School of Education, specializing in Human Development and Psychology, and a PhD in Leadership and Education at the University of San Diego’s School of Leadership and Education Sciences (SOLES) where he was the Dammeyer Fellow.  He was also a Reynolds Fellow in Social Entrepreneurship at the Harvard Kennedy School's Center for Public Leadership, and winner of the 2010 Harvard HDP Marshal Award.

Current work
Dunigan now divides his time between Uganda and Florida in his role as Chief Executive Officer of Aidchild.Dunigan has personally adopted more than 100 children in Uganda. He and the Ugandan staff continue to receive new children.

References

External links 
 

HIV/AIDS organizations
Foreign charities operating in Uganda
Health charities in the United States
Charities based in Florida
Hospices
HIV/AIDS in Uganda
Organizations established in 2000
2000 establishments in Uganda
2000 establishments in the United States
Medical and health organizations based in Florida